Road signs in Norway are regulated by the Norwegian Public Roads Administration, Statens vegvesen.

Signs follow the general European conventions concerning the use of shape and colour to indicate function. Any text included on supplementary signs will normally be in Norwegian, but may in some cases be bi- or trilingual. In Northern parts of Norway, municipal and informative signs may be printed in both Norwegian and Sami. Close to the Finnish border and in municipalities with significant Norwegian Finnish population signs and village names are also shown in Finnish. In areas close to the Russian border, signs may be written in both the Latin and Cyrillic scripts.

No more than three signs (road number indications excepted) may be mounted on any one pole, with the most important sign appearing at the top. As is customary in European countries, all signs are partly or fully reflectorized or are provided with their own night-time illumination.

The current set of designs were introduced through a reform that went into effect 1 June 2006, replacing the old sets from 1967 and 1980. As the law outlining this reform was published 7 October 2005, some signs were already replaced before the law went into effect. The most notable change was the removal of hats and hair on the stickmen making them gender-neutral, but many signs were redesigned or introduced for the first time, as noted below.

Warning signs

Warning signs are mostly triangular, with black symbols on a white background with a red border. Warning signs that are used only temporarily have a yellow background. On Svalbard, a unique warning sign with a black background and white symbol is used for polar bears.

Priority signs

Prohibitory signs

Restrictive signs are mostly circular, with black symbols on a white background with a red border. The exceptions are zone signs which are rectangular, and no parking signs which use a red symbol on a blue background. These signs are valid from where they stand and for the entirety of the road until it is ended by another sign, or until the next crossroads depending on the specific sign.

Mandatory signs

Mandatory signs are all circular like the restrictive signs, but feature white symbols on a blue background.

Informative signs
Some of the informative signs are restrictive (for example, one-way street, and bus lane).

Service signs

Direction signs

Direction signs inform about places, businesses, routes, choice of lanes, choice of roads and distance to destinations. Direction signs with a yellow background (blue on motorways) show geographical destinations. Direction signs with a white background (or white fields on yellow and blue signs) show local destinations. Direction signs with a brown background show destinations of special interest to tourism. Orange backgrounds denote temporary detours.

Supplementary signs

Marker signs
Marker signs inform drivers of a road's onward course, or warn of obstacles near or on the road. Temporary marker signs, e.g. during roadworks, use a red background colour.

Notes

References

Road transport in Norway
Norway